Rugby union is a growing sport in the Cayman Islands. The Cayman Islands national rugby union team is ranked 62nd in the world, with 2,256 registered players.

Governing body
The governing body is Cayman Rugby, which is a member of the International Rugby Board, and the North American and Caribbean Rugby Association NACRA.

History
Although there has been interest in the game in the Cayman Islands for decades, it only became properly organised in 1972, when the Cayman Islands RFC was founded. This team faced the challenge of having no rugby ball, pitch, and no clubhouse, for several years, and their nearest opponents were in Jamaica 600 miles away. In 1975, however, Jeff Butterfield, a former England player acquired the rights to a piece of pine forest, which was turned into their pitch.

Nowadays, the islands have their own men's team, and also a women's team, which was established in 2004. There is also a national Sevens team. A schools development programme is also now in force.

The Cayman Islands compete in the Caribbean Championship, a tournament which includes Trinidad and Tobago, Bermuda, Martinique, Jamaica, the Bahamas, British Virgin Islands, Antigua and Guyana.

Teams

Male
 Queensgate Pigs Trotters RFC (Originally a police team)
 Advance Fire & Plumbing Buccaneers RFC
 John Doak Iguanas RFC
 Fidelity Cayman Storm RFC

Other former teams include:
 The Cayman Surge 
 ReMax Old Boys - Tarnished Turtles RFC

Female
 The Iguanas
 Buccaneers
 Trotters

References
 Bath, Richard (ed.) The Complete Book of Rugby (Seven Oaks Ltd, 1997 )
 Cotton, Fran (Ed.) (1984) The Book of Rugby Disasters & Bizarre Records. Compiled by Chris Rhys. London. Century Publishing.

External links
 Cayman Rugby
 Cayman Islands on IRB.com
 NAWIRA Cayman Islands page
 Cayman Islands on RugbyData.com
 Boost for Rugby 7's in the Americas & Caribbean
 Archives du Rugby: Cayman Islands